The 2012 Coupe de la Ligue Final was the 18th final of France's football league cup competition, the Coupe de la Ligue, a football competition for the 42 teams that the Ligue de Football Professionnel (LFP) manages. The final took place on 14 April 2012 at the Stade de France in Saint-Denis and was contested between Lyon and Marseille. The latter club entered the match as the two-time defending champions of the competition and sought to become the first club in French football history to win the competition three consecutive years after previously becoming the first club to win the competition in back-to-back seasons. Lyon made its first finals appearance since the 2008 Coupe de France Final and played at the Stade de France for the first time in nearly three years. The final was broadcast live on public network broadcaster France Télévisions.

Marseille captured its third straight league cup title after defeating Lyon 1–0 after an extra time goal from Brandão.
The Man of the Match award was given to Cameroonian international Nicolas N'Koulou. Marseille secured a UEFA Europa League place for the 2012–13 season.

News

Team backgrounds 

Lyon appeared in its fourth final of the Coupe de la Ligue. The Rhône-Alpes-based club won its only league cup title in 2001 defeating Monaco 2–1 after extra time. In Lyon's other two finals appearances, the club finished runner-up to Metz and Bordeaux in 1996 and 2007, respectively. Lyon made its first finals appearance since the 2008 Coupe de France Final when the club beat Paris Saint-Germain 1–0. The club also played at the Stade de France for the first time in nearly three years. The last time Lyon played at the country's national stadium was in a domestic league match against Lille. Lyon lost the match 2–0.

Marseille made its third appearance in the final of the Coupe de la Ligue. The club was the competition's defending champions having defeated Montpellier 1–0 in last year's final. As a result, Marseille became the first club in the French football history to win the competition in consecutive seasons; the club defeated Bordeaux 3–1 in 2010. Les Phocéens attempted to become the first club to win the Coupe de la Ligue in three consecutive years.

Ticketing 

The Coupe de la Ligue final has been played every year at the Stade de France since 1998, following the stadium's completion. The stadium has a capacity of 81,338 spectators. Each club that will participate in the final will receive the same quota of tickets, which are distributed to season ticket holders and through each club's ticket sales at a later date. Tickets went on sale to the general public on 28 March 2012, three weeks before the final, and were immediately sold out.

Officials 

On 5 April, the LFP announced that the Direction Nationale de l’Arbitrage (DNA) had confirmed referee Stéphane Lannoy of Nord-Pas-de-Calais would officiate the 2012 Coupe de la Ligue final. Lannoy, a Fédéral F1 referee, the highest designation given to a referee in France, has officiated matches at the 2008 Summer Olympics, in the UEFA Champions League, UEFA Cup and qualifiers for the UEFA Euro 2008, UEFA Euro 2012, and 2010 FIFA World Cup. He has presided over five matches involving either of the two teams this season; three matches for Lyon and two for Marseille. Lyon lost two of the three matches, while Marseille won both of its ties that Lannoy officiated. Lannoy refereed his second league cup final, his first being in 2010, and was assisted by Eric Dansault of Centre and Frédéric Cano of Centre-Ouest. Lionel Jaffredo of Brittany will serve as the fourth official.

Time change 

On 30 March 2012, the Ligue de Football Professionnel confirmed that the kick-off of the 2012 Coupe de la Ligue final would be moved from its originally scheduled time of 20:45 to 21:00. The decision was made by the LFP as a result of television channel France 2's, which aired the final, obligations towards the upcoming 2012 French presidential election.

Match

Pre-match 

The opening kick-off was done by former players Sonny Anderson and Abedi Pele. Both players have starred for Lyon and Marseille during their careers, however, each is known primarily for their stints with each club; Anderson with Lyon and Pele with Marseille. With Les Gones, Anderson won two league titles in 2001 and 2002 and also captured the 2000–01 Coupe de la Ligue title. Pele is a member of the FIFA 100 and won two league titles in the early 90s with Marseille. In 1993, he helped the club win the UEFA Champions League. In his five-year stint with Marseille, Pele won the African Footballer of the Year award three times.

Details

Road to the final

See also
 Choc des Olympiques

References

External links 
 Official website

Coupe De La Ligue Final
2012
Olympique de Marseille matches
Olympique Lyonnais matches
April 2012 sports events in Europe
Sport in Saint-Denis, Seine-Saint-Denis
Football competitions in Paris
2012 in Paris